Scutia is a genus of flowering plants in the family Rhamnaceae, native to the Galápagos, South America, Africa, Madagascar, the Mascarene Islands, the Indian subcontinent, Sri Lanka, southern China and Southeast Asia. They are shrubs or small trees.

Species
Currently accepted species include:
Scutia arenicola (Casar.) Reissek
Scutia buxifolia Reissek
Scutia colombiana M.C.Johnst.
Scutia myrtina (Burm.f.) Kurz
Scutia spicata (Humb. & Bonpl. ex Schult.) Weberb.

References

Rhamnaceae
Rhamnaceae genera
Taxa named by Adolphe-Théodore Brongniart
Taxa named by Augustin Pyramus de Candolle
Taxa named by Philibert Commerson